The 2003 Dominican Republic earthquake occurred on September 22 at  with a moment magnitude of 6.4 and a maximum Mercalli intensity of X (Extreme).

Earthquake
This earthquake could also be felt in Port-au-Prince, Haiti and western Puerto Rico.
 Research indicated that it was one of a series of westward-propagating earthquakes along the boundary between the North American Plate and the Caribbean Plate.

Damage and casualties
The tremor damaged many buildings across the city of Puerto Plata, the city closest to the epicenter, including two schools. There, a wall collapsed caused vehicular traffic and schools were damaged. In Santiago, several schools were damaged and the airport there was temporarily closed, but was made operational again afterwards. Two hospitals there were evacuated but there was no structural damage and the patients were able to go back indoors. In Nagua, schools were damaged in the form of cracks and walls and floors, and a roof of a local hospital collapsed. In the towns of San Cristobal and Cotui, light damage to schools was reported. It caused three fatalities, two of which  suffered heart attacks. Dozens were also injured.

See also 
Gonâve Microplate
List of earthquakes in 2003
List of earthquakes in the Dominican Republic
List of earthquakes in the Caribbean
Septentrional-Oriente fault zone

References 

Sources

External links

Earthquakes in the Dominican Republic
2003 in the Dominican Republic
2003 earthquakes